Lelio Cantoni (1802, Gazzuolo, Dukedom of Mantua – 1857, Turin) was an Italian rabbi. In 1829 he entered the Istituto Rabbinico at Padua, then recently established, graduating as a rabbi in 1832. From 1833 until his death he was chief rabbi of Turin. Endowed with executive ability and magnetic personality, and being a man of deep piety, he ably bridged the gulf that separated the old and the modern views of Judaism.

Recognizing his administrative ability, the government repeatedly entrusted Cantoni with the drafting of statutes affecting the Jewish communities. In 1848 he actively recruited among Turin's Jews and helped organize volunteers into three battalions of sharpshooters to fight for Piedmont-Sardinia against Austria-Hungary.

After the emancipation of the Sardinian Jews in 1848, Cantoni was mainly occupied with the organization of the internal administration of Jewish religious matters. To effect this he published his Nuovo Ordinamento del Culto Israelitico nes Regi Stati, in which he advocated the establishment by the government of consistories, pointing out the means by which these could be supported. Cantoni was the chief promoter of the establishment of asylums for children.

He was also instrumental in founding the best schools and societies of the community of Turin. Most noteworthy among his achievements was his work on behalf of the emancipation of the Jews in the kingdom of Sardinia through the Constitution of 1848, which was subsequently transferred to united Italy. Cantoni's untimely death prevented the realization of his hopes of founding an organization to include all the communities and rabbis of Italy. In addition to writing books for the edification of the young, he was a contributor to the Educatore Israelita and the Archives Israélites.

References

1802 births
1857 deaths
19th-century Italian rabbis
People from Gazzuolo
Clergy from the Province of Mantua